Kunnskapsforlaget is a Norwegian publishing company based in Oslo.

Kunnskapsforlaget was established in 1975, as a partnership between H. Aschehoug & Co. (W. Nygaard) and Gyldendal Norsk Forlag. The purpose was to co-operate on publishing encyclopaedias and dictionaries. The first volume of Store norske leksikon (SNL) was published in 1978. A total of four editions was published (the last one in 2004), before the online version was transferred to Institusjonen Fritt Ord og Sparebankstiftelsen DnB in 2011.

Kunnskapsforlaget is the largest dictionary publisher in Norway. They publish both printed books, and digital dictionaries that are available through the online service Ordnett (launched in 2004). Their main languages are English and Norwegian, but they also have dictionaries in 21 other languages.

In September 2018, Gyldendal Norsk Forlag became the single owner of the company.

As of 2018, the publisher has eight full-time employees. The CEO is Thomas Nygaard.

References

External links
 

Publishing companies of Norway
Companies based in Oslo
Publishing companies established in 1975
1975 establishments in Norway